The 2017–18 Vijay Hazare Trophy was the 16th season of the Vijay Hazare Trophy, a List A cricket tournament in India. It was contested by the 28 domestic cricket teams of India. The following seven teams were drawn in Group A: Assam, Baroda, Haryana, Karnataka, Odisha, Punjab and Railways. In December 2017, the fixtures were brought forward to allow players to practice ahead of the 2018 Indian Premier League.

Points table

Fixtures

Round 1

Round 2

Round 3

Round 4

Round 5

Round 6

Round 7

References

External links
 Series home at ESPN Cricinfo

Vijay Hazare Trophy
Vijay Hazare Trophy
Vijay Hazare Trophy